Patrick Nunn (born 21 July 1969 in Tunbridge Wells, England), is a British composer and educator.

Biography
Nunn read music at Dartington College of Arts studying under Frank Denyer between 1988 and 1991 taking additional tuition with Louis Andriessen at Dartington International Summer School and with Gary Carpenter at the Welsh College of Music and Drama. In 2004, he took his doctorate under Professor Simon Bainbridge at the Royal Academy of Music. He also received tuition under Jonathan Harvey, Tod Machover and Simon Emmerson.

In 1994, Nunn was awarded the Gregynog Composition Prize for Colour Cycle and in 1995, the BBC Radio 3 Composing for Children prize as part of the BBC's Fairest Isle festival for his work Songs of our Generation. His work Into My Burning Veins a Poison for quarter-tone alto flute, piano and electronics was awarded the RCM rarescale Composition Prize in 2004. In 2006, he was awarded a British Composers Award in the solo/duet category for Mercurial Sparks, Volatile Shadows and the Alan Bush Prize for Transilient Fragments in 2008. His proposal for Sentiment of an Invisible Omniscience was awarded the 2010 Millennium Prize from the Birmingham Conservatoire.

He teaches techniques of composition and electroacoustics at the Royal Academy of Music and his compositional work is currently published by Cadenza Music and the ABRSM. In 2013, Nunn was made an Associate of the Royal Academy of Music (ARAM).

Selected Compositions
 Lullaby, (1987, Rev.1998) for children's choir (ss) and piano
 Sonata, 1990 for flute and piano
 Polychrome Musique (1991) for large ensemble
 Colour Cycle (1994 rev. 2015) for violin and piano
 Merry Go Round (1994) for large ensemble
 Songs of our Generation (1995) for children's choir and orchestra
 Man Made (1995) for large amplified ensemble
 Bakers Dozen (1995) for flute and guitar
 Rents (1996) for counter tenor and guitar (electric/acoustic)
 Screw (1996) for large amplified ensemble
 Down In the Underpass (1998) for children's choir and small ensemble
 Raw Fuse (1998) for large amplified ensemble
 Cruise (1998 rev. 2007) for small ensemble
 Un Chant D'amour (1998) for chamber ensemble
 Sprite (1998) for solo piccolo
 Hell Bent inside the Be Oven (1999) for large ensemble
 The Oxen (2000) for children's choir and small ensemble
 String of Pearls (2000) for clarinet, violin and piano
 Black Strokes 1 (2000) for violin and piano
 Eid Milaad Saeed (2000) for solo clarinet
 21st Century Junkie (2001) for six pianos
 Hextych (2001) for small ensemble
 Sleek Silver Symbols (2001) for soprano saxophone, electric guitar, bass guitar and percussion
 Maqamat	(2002) for quarter-tone alto flute
 Un Chant d'amour (2003) for Piano - 4 hands
 Into my burning veins a poison (2004) for quarter-tone alto flute, piano and tape
 Gonk (2004) for bassoon and tape
 Shest Bulgarski Pesni za Detstvoto (2005) for children's choir and small ensemble
 Gaia Sketches (2005) for cello with Hyperbow and live electronics
 Music of the Spheres (2006) for piano and planets (sound file)
 Escape Velocity (2006) for accordion and string quartet
 Mercurial Sparks, Volatile Shadows (2006) for alto flute and piano
 Coalescence (2006) for clarinet, live electronics and movement sensors
 Transillient Fragments (2007) for violin and piano
 Fata Morgana (2007) for cello with Hyperbow, ensemble and live electronics
 Lauten (2007) for small ensemble
 Prism (2008) for bassett clarinet and piano
 47 Tucanae (2008) for piano (four hands) and pulsars (sound file)
 Shoaling (2008) for harp, live electronics and movement sensors
 Intra aspicere (2008) for orchestra and live electronics
 ... of bones and muscle (2009) for piano and electronics
 Isochronous (2010) for piano, percussion and pulsars (sound file/electronics)
 Cameo for Carla (2010) for solo piano
 Pareidolia I (2012) for bass clarinet, sensors and live electronics
 Maya (2012) for two flutes, alto flute and sound file
 Shadowplay (2013 rev. 2015) for bass clarinet
 Gaudete (2013) for choir (SSAATTBB)
 Morphosis (2014) for piano, sensors and live electronics
 Eight Cryptograms (2015) for piano

Discography
 Morphosis (2016) Red Sock Records RSR003CD
 A Bassoonist's Cabinet of Curiosities (2015) Sfz Records SFZM0415
 Music of the Spheres (2009) Red Sock Records RSR001CD
 Prism (2009) NMC D139

Awards
1994: Gregynog, Wales for Colour Cycle
1995: BBC Radio 3 Composing for Children, UK for Songs of our Generation
2004: Rarescale, Royal College of Music, London UK for Into My Burning Veins a Poison
2006: British Composers Award (Solo/Duet), UK for Mercurial Sparks, Volatile Shadows
2008: Alan Bush Award, Royal Academy of Music, London UK for Transilient Fragments
2010: Birmingham Conservatoire Millennium Prize, UK for Sentiment of an Invisible Omniscience
2013: ARAM Associate of the Royal Academy of Music
Nunn has been shortlisted five times for the British Composers Award: in 2006 for Gaia Sketches, in 2007 for Escape Velocity, in 2008 for Transilient Fragments, in 2009 for Prism and in 2012 for Pareidolia I.

References

Composing for Hyperbow - NIME 2006, Nunn, Vassiliev, Young
Building virtual instruments: case studies of gestural innovation in works for piano and electronics - ManiFeste-2015, Inventions du geste musical / Inventing Gestures, IRCAM 2015, Kanga, Nunn

External links
Webpage

1969 births
Living people
20th-century British male musicians
20th-century classical composers
20th-century English composers
21st-century British male musicians
21st-century classical composers
Academics of the Royal Academy of Music
Alumni of the Royal Academy of Music
Alumni of the Royal Welsh College of Music & Drama
English classical composers
English male classical composers
LGBT classical composers